Daniel Vincent Gordh (born 24 June 1985) is an American actor, writer and comedian, probably best known for his portrayal of William Darcy in the Primetime Emmy Award-winning web series The Lizzie Bennet Diaries.

Career
Gordh completed a Bachelor of Arts degree in Theatre at the University of California, San Diego in 2007. During college, he competed in springboard diving, and was the UCSD Diver of the Year for 2006–07. Gordh is openly gay, after coming out on social media in 2015.

Gordh has acted in numerous web series. He was a series regular in The Lizzie Bennet Diaries (2012–14), for which he was nominated for the Streamy Award for Best Actor in a Drama in 2014. He also appeared in The Cracked Advice Board (2011), Hipsterhood (2013), The Dark Knight Legacy (2013) for Machinima, and Hollywood Acting Studio (2013), made for the Starz network. 
	
Gordh's television roles include guest appearances on Cold Case and Mad Men, and his film roles include Night Watcher (2008), Black Velvet (2011) and Non-Transferable (2017).

Filmography

Television and Film

Web series

Awards and nominations

References

External links
 

Living people
1985 births
American male comedians
American gay actors
American gay writers
Gay comedians
University of California, San Diego alumni
Comedians from California
21st-century American comedians
21st-century LGBT people
American LGBT comedians